White Plains is a home rule-class city in Hopkins County, Kentucky, United States. The population was 884 at the 2010 census, up from 800 at the 2000 census.

History

White Plains was established in 1853, and was originally known as "Little Prairie."  With the arrival of the railroad in 1870, Little Prairie became the shipping point for a community then known as "White Plains" (modern Fruit Hill) further to the south in Christian County, and thus became known as "White Plains Station," or "New White Plains."  When the postmaster of the Christian County community renamed it "Fruit Hill," the "New" was dropped from the name of the Hopkins County city.

Geography
White Plains is located in southeastern Hopkins County at  (37.184489, -87.384739). U.S. Route 62 passes through the northern part of the community, leading east  to Greenville and west  to Nortonville.

Demographics

As of the census of 2000, there were 800 people, 295 households, and 225 families residing in the city. The racial makeup of the city was 98.25% White, 0.62% Black or African American, 0.25% Asian, 0.25% from other races, and 0.62% from two or more races. Hispanic or Latino of any race were 2.50% of the population.

There were 295 households, out of which 36.9% had children under the age of 18 living with them, 61.7% were married couples living together, 11.2% had a female householder with no husband present, and 23.4% were non-families. 22.4% of all households were made up of individuals, and 10.5% had someone living alone who was 65 years of age or older. The average household size was 2.71 and the average family size was 3.14.

In the city, the population was spread out, with 27.1% under the age of 18, 10.3% from 18 to 24, 29.5% from 25 to 44, 23.6% from 45 to 64, and 9.5% who were 65 years of age or older. The median age was 33 years. For every 100 females, there were 100.0 males. For every 100 females age 18 and over, there were 99.0 males.

The median income for a household in the city was $29,205, and the median income for a family was $32,321. Males had a median income of $30,833 versus $16,818 for females. The per capita income for the city was $13,187. About 20.3% of families and 23.6% of the population were below the poverty line, including 34.5% of those under age 18 and 20.8% of those age 65 or over.

References

External links

Populated places established in 1853
Cities in Hopkins County, Kentucky
Cities in Kentucky